Christina Reid (12 March 1942 – 31 May 2015) was an Irish playwright.

Life
Reid was born in North Belfast. She left school in 1957 and married in 1963.

She enrolled at Queen's University Belfast in 1981 but winning a BBC playwrighting competition and becoming a single parent following a divorce meant she did not complete the course.

Reid was a writer-in-residence at the Lyric Theatre, and at the Young Vic. Reid was a scriptwriter on BBC Radio 4's drama series Citizens.

Reid was a Patron of YouthAction Northern Ireland, a charity working to inspire young people. One of its projects is the Rainbow Factory which has over 450 young people participating a range of classes, workshops and performances.

Private life
She was mother to three daughters Heidi, Tara and Siubhan.

Awards
 Thames Television Playwriting Award for "Tea in a China Cup"
 1980 Ulster Television Drama Award, "Did You Hear the One About the Irishman?"
 1986 George Devine Award for "The Belle of Belfast City"

Selected works

Plays
Tea In A China Cup, Lyric Theatre, Belfast, Northern Ireland, 1983
Did You Hear The One About The Irishman . . .?, New York, 1985
Joyriders, Tricycle Theatre, London, 1986
The Belle Of Belfast City, Lyric Theatre, Belfast, Northern Ireland, 1989
My Name, Shall I Tell You My Name? Andrews Lane Theatre, Dublin, 1989
Les Misérables, Nottingham Playhouse, 1992
The King of the Castle, Cottesloe Theatre, National Theatre, London, 1999
Clowns, The Room, Orange Tree, Richmond, 1996
A Year And A Day, National Theatre, London, 2007

Books
Christina Reid, Plays I, Methuen, 1997.

References

1942 births
2015 deaths
Irish women dramatists and playwrights
Alumni of Queen's University Belfast
20th-century Irish dramatists and playwrights
20th-century Irish women writers
21st-century Irish dramatists and playwrights
21st-century Irish women writers
Place of birth missing